"Setting Sun" is a song by American rock musician Jerry Cantrell, written for the soundtrack of DC Comics' graphic novel Dark Nights: Metal. The song was written by Cantrell, Mike Elizondo and Tyler Bates, and was released as a single through digital platforms on July 19, 2018. The soundtrack featuring "Setting Sun" was released exclusively on a 12-inch vinyl picture disc on September 28, 2018, accompanied by a poster and a 32-page comic book.

Release
The song was released on Warner Bros. Records' official YouTube channel on July 19, 2018, and it was also made available for streaming and digital download via Spotify, iTunes, Apple Music, Google Play and Deezer.

Personnel
 Jerry Cantrell – vocals, guitar
 Tyler Bates – guitar
 Mike Elizondo – bass guitar
 Gil Sharone – drums
 Henry Lunetta – keyboards

Production
 Produced by Mike Elizondo, Tyler Bates
 Engineered by Paul Figueroa
 Assistant engineered by Alonzo Lazaro
 Edited by Henry Lunetta
 Mastered by Chris Gehringer
 Mixed by Adam Hawkins

References

External links
Official website

2018 singles
2018 songs
Theme music
Jerry Cantrell songs
Songs written by Jerry Cantrell
Songs written by Tyler Bates
Songs written by Mike Elizondo
Warner Records singles